Bijan Allipour (born 27 March 1949, Masjed Soleyman, Iran) is an Iranian business executive and upstream oil and gas expert. He is an advisor to the Petroleum Minister of Iran (Bijan Zangeneh) in development projects. He was chairman and CEO of National Iranian South Oil Company (NISOC) from 2014 to 2018. Allipour was also a member of the board of directors of National Iranian Oil Company (NIOC). Prior to his current position he was the senior executive vice president of NISOC, which he had joined in 1979.

He holds a master's degree in Industrial Engineering from the University of Central Oklahoma. Among other positions, Allipour used to have in NISOC are Manager of Engineering and Construction, Director of Road & Construction and Head of Transportation and Logistics of NIOC. Prior to this, he used to be the Advisor of Khuzestan's Governor in Civil Projects.

In 2015, NISOC was the largest Iranian oil company and produced about 3 million barrels of oil per day. NISOC output accounted for nearly 83% of total crude oil production of Iran.

Early life and education
Allipour was born in Masjed Soleyman, Iran, in 1949. He holds a B.S. in Mechanical Engineering and master's degree of Industrial Engineering from the University of Central Oklahoma.

Career 
Prior to his appointment as managing director of NISOC, Allipour held the following positions:
 Member of the board of directors at the National Iranian Oil Company.
 advisor to the Petroleum Minister of Iran in development projects.
  chairman and CEO of National Iranian South Oil Company (NISOC).
  chairman of Karoun, Marun, Aghajari, Masjed Soleyman and Gachsaran Oil and Gas Production Companies.
 Program Manager of Petro Iran Company.
 General Manager of Engineering & Construction at NISOC.
 Vice president of National Iranian South Oil Company.
 Head of Road & Construction of NIOC.
 Director of Transportation and Logistics of NIOC.
 Advisor to Khuzestan's Governor in Civil Projects.

Allipour is also a member of the board of trustees of the Cultural Heritage, Handicrafts and Tourism Organization of Iran.

References 

Iranian businesspeople
1949 births
Living people
People from Masjed Soleyman
University of Central Oklahoma alumni
Iranian chief executives
Iranian mechanical engineers
Iranian engineers
National Iranian Oil Company people
Iranian industrial engineers
Directors of the National Iranian Oil Company